The 1975 Texas Tech Red Raiders football team represented Texas Tech University in the Southwest Conference (SWC) during the 1975 NCAA Division I football season. In their first season under head coach Steve Sloan, the Red Raiders compiled a 6–5 record (4–3 against conference opponents), finished in fourth place in the SWC, and outscored opponents by a combined total of 272 to 251. The team's statistical leaders included Tommy Duniven with 1,038 passing yards, Larry Isaac with 751 rushing yards, and Sammy Williams with 496 receiving yards. The team played its home games at Clifford B. & Audrey Jones Stadium.

Schedule

References

Texas Tech
Texas Tech Red Raiders football seasons
Texas Tech Red Raiders football